Total Gym is the brand name for a line of fitness training equipment, created by Total Gym Global Corp, marketed and sold by Total Gym Commercial LLC and Total Gym Fitness, LLC. Total Gym equipment is used by physical therapy clinics, hospitals, collegiate and professional sports teams, health clubs, fitness studios, and home exercisers. The relationship between the two companies is not clearly outlined on their websites.

History
Total Gym CEO Tom Campanaro designed the first Total Gym incline trainer in 1974. Campanaro and partner Doug Marino developed the machine, and named the brand “Total Gym” while sitting on the beach in San Diego, CA. They brought on business partners Dale McMurray and Larry Westfall in 1976 and the first Total Gym homegrown TV commercial hit the market. In 1988, Total Gym moved into physical therapy. As of February 2022, most or all of the home equipment line is made in China.

Infomercial 
In 1996, Campanaro made a deal with American Telecast Products to produce the first Total Gym infomercial, featuring spokespersons Chuck Norris and Christie Brinkley.  Total Gym became one of the longest running fitness infomercials in history. Doing business as Total Gym Fitness, LLC, the infomercial has been broadcast to more than 85 countries, with over 5 million units sold.

References

Weight training equipment
Exercise equipment
Exercise-related trademarks

External Links
Total Gym website with commercial equipment focus, totalgym.com, retrieved on 2022-02-20.
Total Gym Direct website (Total Gym Fitness) with home equipment focus., totalgymdirect.com, retrieved on 2022-02-20.
Better Business Bureau - Total Gym Direct rating and complaints page, bbb.org, retrieved on 2022-02-20.